The 2021 Piala Sumbangsih was the 36th edition of the Piala Sumbangsih, an annual football match played between the winners of the previous season's Malaysia Super League and Malaysia Cup. Due to the COVID-19 pandemic, the 2020 Malaysia Cup and the 2020 Malaysia FA Cup tournaments were cancelled. Hence, the game was played between the champions of the 2020 Malaysia Super League, Johor Darul Ta'zim, and the league's runners-up, Kedah Darul Aman.

Johor Darul Ta'zim won the match 2–0, winning their sixth Piala Sumbangsih title.

Match details

Winners

Notes

References 

Piala Sumbangsih seasons
2021 in Malaysian football